André Augusto Leone (born 12 February 1979) is a Brazilian retired footballer who played as a central defender.

Club career
Leone was born in Vargem Grande do Sul, São Paulo. From 2000 to 2008 he represented, in Brazil, Campinas-SP, CR Vasco da Gama, Ituano Futebol Clube, Goiás Esporte Clube (twice), Cruzeiro Esporte Clube, Sport Club Corinthians Paulista and Vila Nova Futebol Clube.

During that timeframe, Leone also had abroad stints with Vicenza Calcio and A.C. Siena in Italy. After failing to appear for either side, he joined S.C. Braga of Portugal for the 2008–09 season, playing more than initially expected in his first year due to longtime injuries to habitual starters Paulo Jorge and Alberto Rodríguez. He also managed to score in the 3–0 home win against Standard Liège for the round of 16 in the UEFA Cup (4–1 on aggregate).

Leone featured less in the 2009–10 campaign, but still took part in 11 Primeira Liga matches as Braga finished a best-ever second, netting in a 2–0 home victory over C.D. Nacional on 8 January 2010. He returned to his country in June, agreeing to a deal at Sport Club Recife.

In May 2011, the 32-year-old Leone decided not to extend his contract with Sport and left the club.

Honours
Vasco da Gama
Taça Guanabara: 2001

Ituano
Campeonato Brasileiro Série C: 2003

Cruzeiro
Campeonato Mineiro: 2006

References

External links
CBF data 

1979 births
Living people
Brazilian footballers
Association football defenders
Campeonato Brasileiro Série A players
Campeonato Brasileiro Série B players
CR Vasco da Gama players
Ituano FC players
Goiás Esporte Clube players
Cruzeiro Esporte Clube players
Sport Club Corinthians Paulista players
Vila Nova Futebol Clube players
Sport Club do Recife players
Guarani FC players
L.R. Vicenza players
A.C.N. Siena 1904 players
Primeira Liga players
S.C. Braga players
Brazilian expatriate footballers
Expatriate footballers in Italy
Expatriate footballers in Portugal
Brazilian expatriate sportspeople in Italy
Brazilian expatriate sportspeople in Portugal